The Môa River is a river of Acre state in western Brazil. It is a tributary of the  Juruá River.

The Môa River flows through the northern part of the Serra do Divisor National Park, and forms part of its north eastern boundary.
It continues east until it joins the Juruá River.

See also
List of rivers of Acre

References

Rivers of Acre (state)